Beatrice of Vermandois ( – after 26 March 931) was a Carolingian aristocrat, queen of Western Francia by marriage to Robert I, and mother of Hugh the Great.

Life
Beatrice was the daughter of Herbert I, Count of Vermandois. She was also the sister of Herbert II, Count of Vermandois, and was a descendant in the male line of Charlemagne through King Bernard of Italy. Through her marriage to Robert I, she was an ancestress of the Capetian dynasty. On 15 June 923 her husband Robert was killed at the Battle of Soissons shortly after which their son Hugh was offered the crown but refused. Beatrice died in 931.

Marriage and issue

Beatrice married , becoming the second wife of Robert, Margrave of Neustria, who became the King of France in 922. They were the parents of:
 Hugh the Great – father of Hugh Capet

Notes

References

Sources

|-

Herbertien dynasty
Frankish queens consort
French queens consort
Countesses of Paris
9th-century French people 
10th-century French people 
880s births
10th-century deaths

Year of birth uncertain
Year of death unknown
9th-century French women
10th-century French women
10th-century people from West Francia